Ernest Andrew Royal (June 2, 1921 in Los Angeles, California – March 16, 1983 in New York City) was a jazz trumpeter. His older brother was clarinetist and alto saxophonist Marshal Royal, with whom he appears on the classic Ray Charles big band recording The Genius of Ray Charles (1959).

Career
He began in Los Angeles as a member of Les Hite's Orchestra in 1937. In the following 20 years he would work with Lionel Hampton, Woody Herman, Count Basie, Duke Ellington, Wardell Gray, Stan Kenton and recording as a member of the Charles Mingus Octet, with Teo Macero, John Lewis and Kenny Clarke, among others, in 1953. He led ten albums, most of them recorded in Paris. In 1957 he became a staff musician for the American Broadcasting Company. He went on to play in The Tonight Show Band and can be heard on the Miles Davis albums Miles Ahead (1957), Porgy and Bess (1958), and Sketches of Spain (1960).

Death
A resident of Teaneck, New Jersey, Royal died of cancer at age 61 at Mount Sinai Hospital on March 16, 1983.

Discography 
1953: Portraits on Standards, The Kenton Era – Stan Kenton
1954: Afro, Dizzy and Strings – Dizzy Gillespie
1955: Jazz Recital – Dizzy Gillespie
1955: Accent on Tenor Sax – Coleman Hawkins
1955: Another One – Oscar Pettiford
1955: Introducing Jimmy Cleveland and His All Stars – Jimmy Cleveland
1955: Sonny Stitt Plays Arrangements from the Pen of Quincy Jones – Sonny Stitt
1955: Top Brass – Ernie Wilkins
1956: The Hawk in Hi Fi – Coleman Hawkins
1956: In the Land of Hi-Fi with Julian Cannonball Adderley – Cannonball Adderley
1956: The Oscar Pettiford Orchestra in Hi-Fi – Oscar Pettiford
1956: The Drum Suite (RCA Victor, 1956) – Manny Albam-Ernie Wilkins and their Orchestra
1956: Salute to Satch – Joe Newman
1957: Miles Ahead – Miles Davis
1957: Phineas Newborn, Jr. Plays Harold Arlen's Music from Jamaica – Phineas Newborn, Jr.
1957: My Fair Lady Loves Jazz – Billy Taylor
1958: New Bottle Old Wine – Gil Evans
1958: Porgy and Bess – Miles Davis
1958: A Map of Jimmy Cleveland – Jimmy Cleveland
1958: Brass & Trio – Sonny Rollins
1958: Porgy & Bess Revisited – Stewart-Williams & Co.
1959: Brass Shout – Art Farmer
1959: Late Date with Ruth Brown – Ruth Brown
1959: The Genius of Ray Charles – Ray Charles
1959: The Birth of a Band!, The Great Wide World of Quincy Jones – Quincy Jones
1959: You and Lee – Lee Konitz
1959: Something to Swing About – Carmen McRae
1959: Portrait of the Artist – Bob Brookmeyer
1960: Gillespiana – Dizzy Gillespie
1960: Sister Salvation – Slide Hampton
1960: Sketches of Spain – Miles Davis
1960: Big Joe Rides Again – Big Joe Turner
1961: Perceptions – Dizzy Gillespie 
1961: Satan in High Heels (soundtrack) – Mundell Lowe
1961: White Gardenia – Johnny Griffin
1962: The Soul of Hollywood – Junior Mance
1962: Cabin in the Sky – Curtis Fuller
1962: Listen to Art Farmer and the Orchestra – Art Farmer
1962: Soul Street – Jimmy Forrest
1962: Big Bags – Milt Jackson
1962: The Complete Town Hall Concert – Charles Mingus
1962: On My Way & Shoutin' Again!– Count Basie
1963: Several Shades of Jade – Cal Tjader
1963: For Members Only – Shirley Scott
1963: Latin Fever – Herbie Mann
1964: New Fantasy – Lalo Schifrin
1964: Rough House Blues – Lou Donaldson
1964: My Kinda Groove – Herbie Mann
1964: The Cat – Jimmy Smith
1964: J.J.! – J. J. Johnson
1964: Quincy Jones Explores the Music of Henry Mancini – Quincy Jones
1965: Quincy Plays for Pussycats – Quincy Jones
1965: Once a Thief and Other Themes – Lalo Schifrin
1965: Ray Brown / Milt Jackson – Ray Brown and Milt Jackson
1965: Broadway Soul – Sonny Stitt
1965: With Respect to Nat – Oscar Peterson
1965: Latin Mann – Herbie Mann
1965: Broadway Express – J. J. Johnson
1966: Happenings – Hank Jones and Oliver Nelson
1966: Encyclopedia of Jazz – Oliver Nelson
1966: The Sound of Feeling – Oliver Nelson
1966: Got My Mojo Workin' and Hoochie Coochie Man – Jimmy Smith
1966: Brass on Fire and The Soul of the City – Manny Albam
1966: Our Mann Flute – Herbie Mann
1966: Spanish Rice – Clark Terry and Chico O'Farrill
1966: Blue Notes – Johnny Hodges
1967: Glory of Love – Herbie Mann
1967: Half a Sixpence – Count Basie
1967: Don't Sleep in the Subway – Johnny Hodges
1967: The Board of Directors – Count Basie with The Mills Brothers
1967: Hip Vibrations – Cal Tjader
1968: Blues – The Common Ground – Kenny Burrell
1968: Silver Cycles – Eddie Harris
1968: Blues – The Common Ground – Kenny Burrell
1969: Shirley Scott & the Soul Saxes – Shirley Scott
1969: The Many Facets of David Newman – David Newman
1969: The Soul Explosion – Illinois Jacquet
1969: Soul '69 – Aretha Franklin
1969: Mr. Blues Plays Lady Soul – Hank Crawford
1970: Houston Express – Houston Person 
1970: Louis Armstrong and His Friends − Louis Armstrong
1970: 3 Shades of Blue – Johnny Hodges
1970: The Leon Thomas Album – Leon Thomas
1971: My Way – Gene Ammons
1971: Blues in Orbit – Gil Evans
1971: What's Going On – Johnny "Hammond" Smith
1972: Soul Is... Pretty Purdie – Bernard Purdie 
1972: Joy of Cookin' – Joe Thomas
1972: Guess Who – B. B. King
1972: Akilah! – Melvin Sparks
1972: Sweet Buns & Barbeque – Houston Person
1973: Tanjah – Randy Weston
1973: The Weapon – David Newman
1973: Simba – O'Donel Levy
1974: New Groove – Groove Holmes
1974: 10 Years Hence – Yusef Lateef
1974: Oliver Edward Nelson in London with Oily Rags – Oliver Nelson
1975: There Comes a Time – Gil Evans
1977: Color as a Way of Life – Lou Donaldson
1978: Gil Evans Live at the Royal Festival Hall London 1978 – Gil Evans

References

External links
1978 interview
[ All Music]
 Ernie Royal recordings at the Discography of American Historical Recordings.

1921 births
1983 deaths
Swing trumpeters
American jazz trumpeters
American male trumpeters
Deaths from cancer in New York (state)
Duke Ellington Orchestra members
People from Teaneck, New Jersey
20th-century American musicians
American male jazz musicians
20th-century American male musicians